Echinopyge is a trilobite in the order Phacopida, that existed during the lower Devonian in what is now Turkey. It was described by Haas in 1968, and the type species is Echinopyge cathamma. The type locality was the Kurtdogmus Formation.

References

External links
 Echinopyge at the Paleobiology Database

Acastidae
Fossil taxa described in 1968
Devonian trilobites of Asia
Fossils of Turkey